is a Japanese businessman and prominent Shinto priest. 

Takaharu is the 15th head of the Kyōgoku clan (the former Tajima Toyooka clan) which held power in Toyooka before and during the Edo period.  He is among descendants of the Meiji period kazoku (peerage) which was abolished in 1947.

Career
The major part of his working career was spent as an executive at the NYK Line shipping company. Then Kyōgoku headed , which is a small tugboat and port transport firm based in Yokohama.

Takaharu was named the chief priest (kannushi) of the Yasukuni Shrine in 2009.

References

1938 births
Japanese business executives
Japanese Shintoists
Kyōgoku clan
Living people